Jennycliff Bay (often used interchangeably with Jennycliff) is a bay on the South West Coast Path in Plymouth, Devon, England. It is managed by Plymouth City Council and is both designated a County Wildlife Site (CWS) and part of the Site of Special Scientific Interest (SSSI) known as Plymouth Sound, Shores and Cliffs. From its upper grassy area, the bay overlooks Mount Batten and Plymouth Sound.

Nature

Site of Special Scientific Interest 

Jennycliff Bay forms part of the Site of Special Scientific Interest (SSSI) known as Plymouth Sound, Shores and Cliffs. It is a Designated Site within the "Jennycliff to Bovisand" management unit and said to be in favourable condition.

County Wildlife Site 

Jennycliff Bay is also designated a County Wildlife Site (CWS). This is primarily because it contains four Nationally Scarce species:

Pale St John's Wort
Maidenhair fern
Dwarf elder
Round-leaved cranesbill

The Site Management Statement for Jennycliff CWS reports sightings of "Devon notable species" including ivy broomrape, dotted sedge, distant sedge, sea rocket and sea spleenwort. Further, the spider Episinus maculipes has been observed.

Geology 

The cliff face is inclined and the shore is composed of steep broken bedrock and boulders of various sizes.

References

External links 

Bays of Devon
County wildlife sites in England
Sites of Special Scientific Interest in Devon